John Pulskamp (born June 24, 1935) is an American weightlifter. He competed in the men's middle heavyweight event at the 1960 Summer Olympics.

References

External links
 

1935 births
Living people
American male weightlifters
Olympic weightlifters of the United States
Weightlifters at the 1960 Summer Olympics
Sportspeople from Cleveland
20th-century American people
21st-century American people